Enteromius traorei is a species of ray-finned fish in the genus Enteromius which has only been recorded from the River Cavally in the Ivory Coast and which is threatened by deforestation.

Footnotes 

 

Endemic fauna of Ivory Coast
Enteromius
Taxa named by Christian Lévêque
Taxa named by Guy G. Teugels
Taxa named by Thys van den Audenaerde
Fish described in 1987